Peter Rowe may refer to:

 Peter C. Rowe, chronic fatigue syndrome specialist
 Peter Rowe (politician) (1807–1876), U.S. politician from New York
 Peter Rowe (filmmaker) (born 1947), Canadian filmmaker
 Peter Rowe (rugby) (born 1947), Welsh rugby union, and rugby league footballer of the 1960s and 1970s
 Peter Trimble Rowe (1856–1942), first bishop of the Episcopal Diocese of Alaska
 Peter Rowe (judge), (died c. 1403) Irish judge, Lord Chief Justice of Ireland, 1388–1397
 Peter G. Rowe, architect, author, researcher, professor